Ernesto Montemayor Sr. (born 26 November 1907, date of death unknown) was a Mexican sports shooter. He competed at the 1948 Summer Olympics and 1952 Summer Olympics. His son also competed at the Olympics.

References

1907 births
Year of death missing
Mexican male sport shooters
Olympic shooters of Mexico
Shooters at the 1948 Summer Olympics
Shooters at the 1952 Summer Olympics
People from Nuevo León
Pan American Games medalists in shooting
Pan American Games bronze medalists for Mexico
Shooters at the 1951 Pan American Games
Medalists at the 1951 Pan American Games
20th-century Mexican people